"NASA" is a song by American singer Ariana Grande, from her fifth studio album, Thank U, Next (2019). It was released on February 8, 2019 through Republic Records. It was written by Grande, Victoria Monét, Tayla Parx, and its producers Tommy Brown and Charles Anderson.

Commercially, it reached the top 20 in Greece, Australia, Canada, Malaysia, Singapore and the United States.

Recording and production 

"NASA", named after the U.S. space agency of the same name, was written by Ariana Grande, Victoria Monét, Tayla Parx and its producers Tommy Brown and Charles Anderson. Grande's vocals were recorded by at the Jungle City Studios in New York City. Serban Ghenea mixed the track, and Brendan Morawski and Billy Hickey engineered the track assisted by Sean Kline.

The track features a spoken introduction by Shangela, an American drag queen. She says, "One small step for woman, one giant leap for womankind", a variation on Neil Armstrong's quote, "That's one small step for a man, one giant leap for mankind." Shangela has said of the origins of her contribution to the track:

Critical reception
"NASA" received positive reviews from critics, with many noting it as a highlight from the album. The Atlantic Spencer Kornhaber wrote, "On the top-tier bop 'NASA', which evokes Grande's sonic godmother Mariah Carey without recycling her, she kindly but firmly asks a lover for a night apart." In his review of Thank U, Next, Michael Cragg of The Guardian said of the song, "The springy, joyous NASA, which harks back to her debut, 2013's Yours Truly, takes the theme of planetary exploration and turns it into a plea for space (geddit?)." Carolyn Bernucca of Complex said, "The standout track, 'NASA,' is punctuated by thumping bass and trap drums that have made their way from Atlanta all the way into mainstream pop." Mathew Rodriguez of Out wrote, "On this banger, Ari demands distance from a smothering loved one, but it’s also very much an ode to self-care, something everyone in Grande’s target demographic — everyone — thinks about. The good news is that the verses are killer and succeed at establishing the kind of mood Grande wants to create. That said, the chorus here feels a little mismatched with the rest of the song. It’s not that it’s bad, but the rest of the song is so chill, that her Toni Basil-like repetition of “space” over and over feels a little underwritten."

"NASA" was ranked as one of the best songs of 2019 by several publications. Pitchfork stated that "on an album largely about the joys of being unattached, "NASA" offers a nuance: the freedom to be attached, just not right now. “I can’t really miss you if I’m with you,” Grande offers, gently reminding a lover that intimacy doesn’t mean constant proximity. While Grande’s refrain of “I’m a star, I’ma need space” verges on cutesy, the delicate harmonies and airy production of “NASA” make its blown-out bass and trap drums feel weightless." Rolling Stone said the song was "a deeply empathetic (and devastatingly catchy) ode to wanting to be alone, and letting absence make hearts grow fonder. The beat, courtesy of producers Tommy Brown and Charles Anderson, is the standout on an album with stiff competition, based around a whistling, underwater-sounding synth. The writing, which took place in a marathon New York recording run, is some of Grande’s sharpest to date. And on top of all that, the song’s basic thesis is correct: If you haven’t listened to it in a while, throw it on right now. You’ll like it even more than you used to." Uproxx ranked 'NASA' at number 18 on their year-end list, saying that "more songs about self-sufficiency within relationships can only be a good thing for Ariana’s young fans, and those of still floundering through codependency issues in our thirties." Stereogum ranked it at number 19 on their Top 40 Pop Songs of 2019 list.

Commercial performance 
Following the release of Thank U, Next, "NASA" debuted on at number 17 on the Billboard Hot 100 issue dated February 23, 2019, becoming Grande's 18th top-twenty hit on that chart, the fifth top-twenty entry from the album and her second highest-charting non-single in the United States. Consequently, Thank U, Next became the first female album to have five top-twenty entries on the Hot 100 since Taylor Swift's Reputation the year before.

Credits and personnel 
Credits adapted from Tidal.
 Ariana Grande – lead vocals, songwriter, vocal producer
 Victoria Monét – backing vocals, songwriter, vocal producer
 Tayla Parx – backing vocals, songwriter
 Tommy Brown – producer, songwriter, programmer
 Charles Anderson – producer, songwriter, programmer
 Billy Hickey – engineer, studio personnel
 Brendan Morawski – engineer, studio personnel
 John Hanes – mixing engineer, studio personnel
 Serban Ghenea – mixer, studio personnel
 Sean Klein – assistant recording engineer, studio personnel

Charts

Certifications

References

External links
 

2019 songs
Ariana Grande songs
Songs written by Ariana Grande
Songs written by Victoria Monét
Songs written by Charles Anderson
Songs written by Tommy Brown (record producer)
Song recordings produced by Tommy Brown (record producer)
Song recordings produced by Charles Anderson